Jayashree is an Indian actress who appeared in Tamil-language films in the 1980s. She was introduced by film director C. V. Sridhar in Thendrale Ennai Thodu, opposite Mohan, in 1985. She started a career in technology in 2000, taking a break from acting after her marriage.

Career
Jayashree started her cinematic career with the 1985 Tamil filmThendrale Ennai Thodu, opposite Mohan. After getting married in 1988, she left the film industry to focus on her family, and later began a career in technology. She returned to acting with the 2010 film Kadhal 2 Kalyanam, though it was never released. On Christmas Day 2016, Jayashree's comeback film Manal Kayiru 2 was released internationally.

Personal life
Jayashree is the granddaughter of S. Jayalakshmi, singer and actress, and grandniece of musician and painter S. Rajam and musician and filmmaker S. Balachander, both her grandmother's brothers.
She married Chandrasekhar, a banking professional, in 1988, and they settled in the United States. The couple have two sons.

Filmography
Tamil

Malayalam

Voice acting
 Geetha - Azhagan (1991)
 Jyothika - Pachaikili Muthucharam (2007)

References

External links

Living people
Indian film actresses
Actresses in Tamil cinema
Actresses in Telugu cinema
Actresses from Chennai
Actresses in Malayalam cinema
20th-century Indian actresses
21st-century Indian actresses
1965 births